Japan competed at the 1988 Summer Paralympics in Seoul, South Korea. 143 competitors from Japan won 46 medals including 17 gold, 12 silver and 17 bronze and finished 14th in the medal table.

See also 
 Japan at the Paralympics
 Japan at the 1988 Summer Olympics

References 

Japan at the Paralympics
1988 in Japanese sport
Nations at the 1988 Summer Paralympics